Giora Feidman (born 25 March 1936) is an Argentine-born Israeli clarinetist who specializes in klezmer music.

Biography
Giora Feidman was born in Buenos Aires, Argentina, where his Bessarabian Jewish parents immigrated to escape persecution. Feidman comes from a family of klezmer musicians. His father, grandfather and great-grandfather made music for weddings, bar mitzvahs, and holiday celebrations in the shtetls of Eastern Europe. Feidman married Ora Bat-Chaim, his personal manager, in 1975.

Music career

Feidman began his career in Buenos Aires as a member of the Teatro Colón Symphony Orchestra. Two years later he immigrated to Israel to become the youngest clarinetist ever to play with the Israel Philharmonic Orchestra. He was a member of the orchestra for over 20 years. In the early 1970s he began his solo career. He has performed with the Berliner Symphoniker, the Kronos Quartet, the Polish Chamber Philharmonic, the Munich Chamber Philharmonic Orchestra, and the Munich Radio Orchestra. In 1974 the Israeli Philharmonic Orchestra commissioned composer Misha Segal to write a concerto for clarinet and orchestra for Giora Feidman. The one-movement piece, which was based on an original nigun, premiered that same year.

Movie director Steven Spielberg invited him to play the clarinet solos for the soundtrack of Schindler's List, which won seven Academy Awards.

Feidman founded the "Clarinet and Klezmer in the Galilee" seminar and master class program, which takes place every year in Safed, Israel.

Discography

 Jewish Soul Music (1973)
 The Singing Clarinet (1987)
 Clarinetango (1990)
 The Magic of the Klezmer (1990)
 Viva el Klezmer (1991)
 Gershwin & The Klezmer (1991)
 The Dance of Joy (1992)
 Klassic Klezmer (1993)
 Concert for the Klezmer (1993)
 Der Rattenfanger (1993)
Prokofiev: Overture on Hebrew Themes for Clarinet, String Quartet and Piano, Op. 34, with the Juilliard String Quartet and Yefim Bronfman (May 18, 1994, Princeton, NJ) - Sony Classical
 Feidman in Jerusalem (1994)
 Klezmer Chamber Music (1995)
 The Soul Chai (1995)
 The Incredible Clarinet (1995)
 For You (1996)
 Schelomo/Barakashot (1996)
 Silence and Beyond — Feidman plays Ora Bat Chaim (1997)
 Feidman in Bayreuth — Lilith — Neun Gesänge der dunklen Liebe (1997)
 Soul Meditation, Harmony of Soul (1997)
 Der Golem — Feidman and the Arditti String Quartet (1997)
 Klezmer Celebration (1997)
 Feidman and Israel Camerata (1998)
 Feidman and Katja Beer — Schubert (1998)
 Journey (1999)
 And the Angels Sing (1999)
 Klezmer and More (2000)
 Rhapsody (2000)
 To Giora Feidman — Your Kletzmer Friends (2000)
 TangoKlezmer (2001)
 Dancing in the Field (2002)
 Feidman plays Piazzolla (2002)
 Love — Feidman plays Ora Bat Chaim (2003)
 Feidman Plays Mozart and More (2003)
 Safad — Feidman and The Safed Chamber Orchestra (2004)
 Ewigkeit dringt in die Zeit (2004)
 Wenn du singst, wie kannst du hassen? (2005)
 Feidman and Eisenberg — Live at St. Severin (2005)
 Crossing Borders (2006)
 Klezmundo (2006)
 Klezmer in the Galilee (2007)
 The Spirit of Klezmer (2008)
 Klezmer & Strings (2009)
 Very Klezmer (2012)
 Feidman plays Beatles! (2017) — Feidman and Rastrelli Cello Quartett

Films
 Jewish Soul Music: The Art of Giora Feidman (1980), directed by Uri Barbash
 Schindler's List (1993), directed by Steven Spielberg: the clarinet solos

See also
 Music of Israel

References

External links
 
 Giora Feidman official site
 Giora Feidman  Pianissimo Musik 
 Giora Feidman last.fm
 Conjuring an era, one note at a time in the mystical city of Safed

1936 births
Living people
Musicians from Buenos Aires
Argentine Jews
Argentine people of Moldovan-Jewish descent
Argentine emigrants to Israel
20th-century Argentine male musicians
21st-century Argentine male musicians
Israeli people of Argentine-Jewish descent
Israeli people of Moldovan-Jewish descent
Jewish Israeli musicians
Klezmer musicians
Clarinetists
Bass clarinetists
Jewish Argentine musicians
20th-century Israeli male musicians
21st-century Israeli male musicians
21st-century clarinetists
Commanders Crosses of the Order of Merit of the Federal Republic of Germany